was a village located in Mima District, Tokushima Prefecture, Japan.

As of 2003, the village had an estimated population of 1,210 and a density of 11.98 persons per km2. The total area was 100.97 km2.

On March 1, 2005, Koyadaira, along with the towns of Mima (former), Anabuki, and Waki (all from Mima District), was merged to create the city of Mima.

External links
 Mima official website (in Japanese)

Dissolved municipalities of Tokushima Prefecture
Mima, Tokushima